The 1966 East Carolina Pirates football team was an American football team that represented East Carolina College (now known as East Carolina University) as a member of the Southern Conference during the 1966 NCAA University Division football season. In their fifth season under head coach Clarence Stasavich, the team compiled a 4–5–1 record.

Schedule

References

East Carolina
East Carolina Pirates football seasons
Southern Conference football champion seasons
East Carolina Pirates football